The Maywood Public Schools are a comprehensive community public school district that serves students in pre-kindergarten through eighth grade from the Borough of Maywood, in Bergen County, New Jersey, United States.

As of the 2018–19 school year, the district, comprising two schools, had an enrollment of 1,001 students and 79.9 classroom teachers (on an FTE basis), for a student–teacher ratio of 12.5:1.

The district is classified by the New Jersey Department of Education as being in District Factor Group "FG", the fourth-highest of eight groupings. District Factor Groups organize districts statewide to allow comparison by common socioeconomic characteristics of the local districts. From lowest socioeconomic status to highest, the categories are A, B, CD, DE, FG, GH, I and J.

After graduating from Maywood Avenue School, approximately 250 students in public school for ninth through twelfth grades had attended Hackensack High School in Hackensack, as part of a sending/receiving relationship with the Hackensack Public Schools, together with students from Rochelle Park and South Hackensack. In the wake of rising tuition costs assessed by the Hackensack district, the district has considered a plan under which the relationship with Hackensack would be severed and a new sending relationship would be established with other neighboring districts. In March 2020, the district received approval from the New Jersey Department of Education to end the relationship it had with Hackensack and will begin transitioning incoming ninth graders to Henry P. Becton Regional High School, which serves students from Carlstadt and East Rutherford beginning in the 2020–21 school year. The transition would be complete after the final group of twelfth graders graduates from Hackensack High School at the end of the 2023–24 school year. Maywood cited costs of nearly $14,800 per student in 2018 to send high-school students to Hackensack and an annual cost in excess of $15,000 under a proposed new three-year agreement, while Becton would start at a per-pupil cost of $10,500 in 2020–21 as part of a ten-year deal that would have a maximum cost per Maywood student of $11,800 in the final year of the agreement.

History
Students from Maywood began attending Hackensack High School in September 1966, after the district ended a longstanding sending relationship under which students had attended Bogota High School.

Awards and recognition
For the 1996-97 school year, Memorial School was formally designated as a National Blue Ribbon School, the highest honor that an American school can achieve.

Schools
Schools in the district (with 2018–19 enrollment from the National Center for Education Statistics) are:
Memorial School with 430 students in grades PreK-3
Ray Bauer, Principal
Maywood Avenue School with 560 students in grades 4-8. The school offers a wide variety of after-school activities ranging from cheerleading to chess club. Older students have the opportunity to contribute to their school newspaper, The Hawk, and their yearbook.
Michael Jordan, Principal

Administration
Core members of the district's administration are:
Michael Jordan, Superintendent of Schools
Jennifer Pfohl, Business Administrator / Board Secretary

Board of education
The district's board of education, comprised of seven members, sets policy and oversees the fiscal and educational operation of the district through its administration. As a Type II school district, the board's trustees are elected directly by voters to serve three-year terms of office on a staggered basis, with either two or three seats up for election each year held (since 2012) as part of the November general election. The board appoints a superintendent to oversee the district's day-to-day operations and a business administrator to supervise the business functions of the district.

References

External links
Maywood Public Schools

Maywood Public Schools, National Center for Education Statistics
Hackensack High School

Maywood, New Jersey
New Jersey District Factor Group FG
School districts in Bergen County, New Jersey